Dolina (or Dolyna in Ukraine) is a Slavic toponym, meaning "valley" or "dale". It may refer to:

Places
Austria
 Dolina (Grafenstein), a village in the Municipality of Grafenstein, Carinthia, southern Austria

Bosnia and Herzegovina
Dolina, Zavidovići, a village in Zavidovići municipality

Bulgaria
Dolina, Bulgaria, a village in Kaolinovo Municipality, Shumen Province

Czech Republic
Dolina, Ústí nad Labem Region (German: Dörnsdorf), on the Preßnitz river, Bohemia

Italy
San Dorligo della Valle, or Dolina in Slovene, a comune of Italy

Poland
Dolina, Lower Silesian Voivodeship (south-west Poland)
Dolina, Łódź Voivodeship (central Poland)
Dolina, Lublin Voivodeship (east Poland)
Dolina, Szczecin, Poland
Dolina, Warmian-Masurian Voivodeship (north Poland)
Dolina, West Pomeranian Voivodeship (north-west Poland)

Romania
Dolina, a village in Leorda Commune, Botoșani County
Dolina, a village in Cornereva Commune, Caraș-Severin County
Dolina (Leorda), a left tributary of the Sitna in Botoșani County
Dolina, a right tributary of the Sitna in Botoșani County

Slovenia
 Dolina pri Lendavi, a village in the Municipality of Lendava, northeastern Slovenia
 Dolina, Puconci, a village in the Municipality of Puconci, northeastern Slovenia
 Dolina, Tržič, a village in the Municipality of Tržič, northwestern Slovenia

Ukraine
Dolyna, a city in Ukraine
Villages:
Dolyna, Ratne Raion, Volyn Oblast
Dolyna, Yurivka Raion, Dnipro Oblast
Dolyna, Slovianskyi Raion, Donetsk Oblast
Dolyna, Tokmak Raion, Zaporizhzhia Oblast
Dolyna, Tlumach Raion, Ivano-Frankivsk Oblast
Dolyna, Obukhiv Raion, Kyiv Oblast
Dolyna, Znamianka Raion, Kropyvnytskyi Oblast
Dolyna, Poltava Raion, Poltava Oblast
Dolyna, Reshetylivka Raion, Poltava Oblast
Dolyna, Mlyniv Raion, Rivne Oblast
Dolyna, Hlukhiv Raion, Sumy Oblast
Dolyna, Nedryhailiv Raion, Sumy Oblast
Dolyna, Terebovlia Raion, Ternopil Oblast
Dolyna, Chortkiv Raion, Ternopil Oblast
And also
Dolyna, Nature Reserve in Khmelnytskyi Oblast

People

Surname 
Alejandro Dolina, Argentine writer, broadcaster and tango expert
Larisa Dolina, Russian singer and actress
Mariya Dolina, Soviet dive bomber pilot
Veronika Dolina, Russian poet, bard, and songwriter

Given name 

 Dolina Wehipeihana, New Zealand Māori dancer, choreographer and theatre producer.

Other
Dolina, a 1973 film by Štefan Uher
 Doline, a term for a sinkhole
 Dolina, a word for valley in some Slavic languages

See also 
Dolina River (disambiguation)